Saint-Évariste-de-Forsyth is a municipality in the Municipalité régionale de comté de Beauce-Sartigan in Quebec, Canada. It is part of the Chaudière-Appalaches region and the population is 647 at the 2006 census.

As with several other municipalities located in the Eastern Townships, Saint-Évariste-de-Forsyth derives its name from its Roman Catholic parish and its township. The parish is named after Pope Evaristus and the township after lumber baron James Bell Forsyth.

References

Commission de toponymie du Québec

Municipalities in Quebec
Incorporated places in Chaudière-Appalaches